Loboberea pygidialis is a species of beetle in the family Cerambycidae, and the only species in the genus Loboberea. It was described by Gahan in 1907.

References

Saperdini
Beetles described in 1907